Viktor Nikolaevich Kokosov (born 1963, Leningrad, USSR) is a Russian journalist and writer. Member of the Russian Union of Writers. Full member of the Russian Geographical Society. Member of the Public Council under the MOI of Russia in the Northwestern Federal District.

Silver winner of the National Literary  Golden Pen of Russia Prize and the winner of the All-Russian  Aleksey Konstantinovich Tolstoy Literary Award.

Great-grandson of the Russian writer Vladimir Jakovlyevich Kokosov's.

References

External links
 http://www.nev-almanah.spb.ru/2004/4_2005/kokosov.shtml
 http://www.voskres.ru/army/publicist/kokosov.htm

1963 births
Living people
Soviet writers
Soviet journalists
Russian male journalists
Russian journalists
Russian war correspondents
20th-century Russian male writers